Top Rank is a boxing promotion company in Las Vegas, US. 

Top Rank may also refer to:
 Top Rank Records, 1950s subsidiary record label of the Rank Organisation in Britain
 Top Rank Suite, a former chain of nightclubs in the UK

See also
 Rank (disambiguation)
 Ranking